Agnibesa recurvilineata is a moth in the family Geometridae first described by Frederic Moore in 1888. It is found in Darjeeling in India, in western China and Nepal.

Subspecies
Agnibesa recurvilineata recurvilineata (Nepal, India)
Agnibesa recurvilineata meroplyta Prout, 1938 (China)

References

Moths described in 1888
Asthenini
Moths of Asia